The Enmore Theatre is a theatre and entertainment venue in Sydney, Australia. It was built in 1908. It is located at 118–132 Enmore Road in Newtown, in the inner west of Sydney's suburbs. It was first opened in 1912 as a photo-play theatre. It was run by a well-known theatre family at the time, the Szarka Brothers. Today's Enmore Theatre is the longest running live theatre in Sydney, hosting concerts, comedians, plays and all forms of performance.  The theatre is considered a medium-sized venue that holds 1,700 people when fully seated and 2,500 when seats are removed, and all attendees are standing. It has hosted many international bands including a performance by Bob Dylan. The venue's art deco style is protected by its listing as a historic building within Sydney. The Enmore theatre has had many renovations and shifts of ownership. Today it is owned by Century and has hosted a range of arts from photographic, performing arts, music and motion picture. The theatre's listing in the Office of Environment and Heritage states that the building "illustrates the development of suburban theatres in the late 1930s and early 1940s and is of social significance for the local community.″ It is the only theatre in Sydney from the Art Deco movement in its original condition. From cinema use to concerts, today is used for various reasons.

History 

Opened in 1912, the theatre was first used as a photo-play theatre that screened silent movies, this was accompanied by a concert orchestra. Patrons could attend silent movies for between 3 and 6 pennies. The venue was run by brothers, William and George Szarka. William Szarka, also known as Bill, was an elected member of the local council from 1914 to 1928. He crowned himself ‘King of Newtown’ on stage at the Enmore theatre in the style of a pageant, complete with pageboys and regal robes. The two brothers rejuvenated the cinema. In 1920, the pair extensively renovated the theatre, before it was opened by then Premier, John Storey, on 1 July in the same year. Messrs Kaberry and Chard Theatre Specialists carried out the renovations. The Sydney Morning Herald reported the cost of this was 24,000 pounds. In 1920 it was reported that the bill would be changed twice a week on Mondays and Fridays. Whilst a cinema owner and local council member, William Szarka was also a boxing promoter and businessman. Together the brothers also ran the Olympia Stadium in nearby Marrickville. In 1926, George and William Szarka joined the Hoyt's cinema chain. 1928 saw the arrival of talking pictures which created a massive surge in cinema attendance. It is estimated that approximately 187 million tickets were sold in Australia in this year. This represents 29 cinema admissions per capita for the year. Soon enough Hoyts Cinema chain purchased the venue from the Szarka brothers in 1936. The brother's company, Szarka Bros Ltd, was liquidated in 1936.

The cinema was closed in 1967 and was reopened in 1969, when it was purchased by the Louis Film Company. The family owned business, adapted and controlled the theatre privately, screening only Greek Films. The venue's name was changed to 'Finos Theatre.' This was popular in an area where 13% of the Greek population lived. The 1980s saw a decline in use of theatres across Sydney, with many theatres closing down. The Australian Elizabethan Theatre trust took control of the Theatre and began renovations. Half a million dollars was spent restoring and extending the venue, once again allowing the venue to host live performances. Unlike other cinemas which were demolished due to the Sydney pro-development movement, the Enmore Theatre was reopened in 1985 with its original name. The Fink family became the sole owner of Hoyts in 1985 and expanded its operations into distribution and home entertainment. The experience of cinema was changing.

In 1991, the Showcall Pty ltd began running the theatre and exceeded $2 million in expenditure to redesign the venue and provide additional space. The popularity of the Enmore Theatre is closely linked with the contemporary development of Newtown as an arts and entertainment hub. The Federal Government in 1992 requested the Australian Broadcasting Authority to begin trials of community television. There was less demand for cinema, and more demand for live entertainment and performances within spaces like the Enmore Theatre.

On 3 March 2022, during a sold-out show by Genesis Owusu, the dance floor collapsed two songs into his set. The concert was halted and rescheduled. No one was injured and the venue confirmed the following day that the floor was repaired and all scheduled shows would still continue.

Events 
A list of some of the more famous musical acts that have performed at the Enmore Theatre

Denotes an upcoming performance
One of its earlier notable events is that the venue hosted several Miss Globe pageants during the 1950s and 1960s. Other performances and shows include Rockwiz, screening the 2018 FIFA World Cup, Comedy Festival 2016, Tuesday Comedy Club Nights, Mardi Gras Party's, Miss Pole Dance Australia, Wogs at Work, The Pink Floyd Experience, My Favourite Murder. Comedy performances include Tom Gleeson, Matt Okine, Kitty Flanagan, Miranda Sings, Daniel Tosh, Merrick and Rosso, Rove McManus and Lano and Woodley.The Enmore Theatre is also becoming known as a major space for children's entertainment featuring acts such as The Wiggles, Justine Clarke, The Fairies, & Lah-Lah.

Australian musician, Steve Balbi, describes the Enmore Theatre as having a "certain prestige...that's kind of a little bit like the Sydney Cricket Ground, not at an arena level but at a theatre level. It's beautiful, it's about music, it's about performance."

In 2020, due to the Global pandemic of COVID-19, and the forced temporary shut down of all venues in Australia, the Enmore Theatre had to cancel and reschedule many performances.

Community use 

The late 20th century saw the local community of Enmore and Newtown become more active in community activism and independent thinking. The Enmore Theatre is therefore not just used for performance purposes. It has previously and is today been used by the local community. In 2015, the local community attended a meeting that proposed the plans for the WestConnex development proposals The local community of the Marrickville, Enmore and Newtown suburbs strongly rejected the proposals actioned by the local and state government. The Enmore Theatre often also supports the local community through hosting local acts and performances. An example of this was in 2014 the Enmore Theatre hosted the event 'Rock the Gate.' This was to raise money in support of protecting farmlands from fracking as well as unconventional gas mining.

In terms of location, the closest train station is Newtown Station, the theatre is within 5 minutes walking distance. Parking is limited in the area. Patrons can, however, book a parking spot to ensure they will have a place to park their vehicle. There are many buses from the CBD to Newtown and Enmore. It is surrounded by cafes, restaurants and bars. There are public toilets on site at the Theatre and it is air conditioned. Inside the venue is three licensed bars. It has confectionary items, snacks, soft drinks and alcohol. There is a cloakroom that charges $3 per item. Condition of entry requires patrons to put large bags or backpacks in the cloakroom. Smoking within the venue is not permitted. For those who wish to collect or purchases tickets at the venue, the Box Office opens 2 hours prior to any performance.

Architecture 

The Enmore Theatre was designed by architects, Kaberry & Chard. Following Federation and the period of nationalism and reform in Australia, architects begun a search for a national style. Around the period that the Enmore Theatre was built, architects in Australia discussed the virtues and influence of the Classical and Gothic styles. Enmore is known for its focus on the goth subculture in Sydney. However, the movement that came from Nationalism and reform was heavily influenced by contemporary architecture in England. By the 1920s and 1930s, Art Deco had become its own movement in Australia where a "crystallised modern architectural expression" was exposed. The Enmore Theatre is of an Art Deco style and architecture. Art Deco is a decorative art style of the 1920s and 1930s characterized by geometric shapes and colours used most in household objects and in architecture. It came from the 1925 French exposition ‘des arts decoratifs’ in Paris.

The Enmore Theatre has been described as "Art Nouveau, Edwardian, Art Moderne and various Art Deco." It is predominantly modern, with aspects of late 19th century and early 20th century architecture. Tropman & Tropman architects completed the most recent heritage study review, acknowledging that the "building is of rendered masonry with a raised parapet and Art Deco motif above the wide, multi-lead doorway." The entrance has pressed metal lining and the doors are made of timber, with glass insertions and brass detailing. The most recent assessment of condition was done in 2001, the local government recorded that the building appeared to be in reasonable condition, with some cracking within the paintwork. The building is classified by the national trust and is registered in the Historic buildings of the Australian Institute of Architects.

Gallery

References

External links
Enmore Theatre Homepage

Theatres in Sydney
Music venues in Sydney
Concert halls in Australia
Newtown, New South Wales
Theatres completed in 1908
Building collapses in 2022
1912 establishments in Australia
Event venues established in 1912